HMS Tartar was a  of the Royal Navy launched in 1907 and sold in 1921. During the First World War, she served in the North Sea and the English Channel with the 6th Destroyer Flotilla.

Construction and design
HMS Tartar was ordered from the Southampton shipbuilder John I. Thornycroft & Company under the 1905–06 shipbuilding programme for the Royal Navy, one of five s ordered under that programme. The Tribals derived from a requirement by the First Sea Lord "Jackie" Fisher, for a steam turbine powered, oil-fueled destroyer capable of at least . Armament was specified as three 12-pounder 12 cwt guns and two 18-inch (450 mm) torpedo tubes. While the Admiralty laid down the basic requirements, the details of the design of individual ships was left to the builders, although the builder's designs did need to be approved by the Director of Naval Construction before orders were placed. This meant that individual ships of the class differed significantly from each other.

Six Thornycroft boilers (in three boiler rooms) fed steam to turbines driving three propeller shafts. The main high-pressure turbine drove the centre shaft, with the outer shafts being fitted with low-pressure turbines, together with cruise and astern turbines. Four funnels were fitted. The ship had a complement of 74 officers and ratings.

Tartar was laid down at Thornycroft's  Woolston shipyard on 13 November 1905 and launched on 25 June 1907. She was completed in April 1908. It had been realised during construction that the armament of the Tribals was too light, so it was decided to strengthen the armament of the first five ships of the class by adding another two 12-pounder guns. The two guns were added to Tartar following acceptance by the Royal Navy.

Service
Tartar formed part of the 1st Destroyer Flotilla of the Home Fleet when it was formed in 1909 and remained part of this formation until 1913, when she joined the 4th Destroyer Flotilla based at Portsmouth.  In October that year, the Tribals were officially designated the F class, and as such the letter "F" was painted on the bows of the class. In February 1914, the Tribals (including Tartar), as their range was too short for effective open sea operations, were sent to Dover, forming the 6th Destroyer Flotilla. On 8 September 1915, the destroyer  was involved in a collision with a transport in the English Channel, suffering a badly damaged bow. She was towed stern first back to Dover, assisted by Tartar,  and the tug Lady Crundall.

On the night of 26/27 October 1916, German torpedo boats of their Flanders Flotilla carried out a large scale raid into the English Channel, hoping to attack the drifters watching the anti-submarine nets of the Dover Barrage, and to sink Allied shipping in the Channel. Six Tribal-class destroyers (Tartar, Mohawk, Viking,  and ) were being held at readiness at Dover as a fast response force,  at readiness in Dover harbour, and when the German 5th Half Flotilla attacked the drifters and sank the old supporting destroyer , they were ordered to intervene. The destroyers split up as they left Dover harbour, with Viking leading Mohawk  and Tartar from the Western entrance to the port, while the other three destroyers left by the Eastern entrance and failed to join up with Vikings group. Nubian and Amazon separately ran into the German 17th Half Flotilla, on its way home after sinking the merchant ship Queen, with Nubian first being badly damaged by a torpedo and Amazon then heavily hit by German shells. Vikings group then encountered a third German formation, the 18th Half Flotilla. Mohawk, second in line of the three British destroyers, was hit by German shells which caused her steering to jam, and turn out of line. Tartar followed Mohawks turn, while Vikings attempts to pursue the German torpedo boats were thwarted when her course was blocked by Mohawk. All the German torpedo boats that took part in the nights operations escaped successfully.

Tartar struck a German mine on 24 June 1917, killing 43 of her crew, including her newly appointed Captain, G. K. Twiss, but was towed to safety. By November 1917, Tartar had joined the 11th Destroyer Flotilla, based at Blyth, Northumberland. On 18 February 1918, Tartar collided with the merchant ship  Ardgantock off West Hartlepool, sinking the merchant ship. Tartar still served with the 11th Submarine Flotilla on 11 November 1918, when the Armistice ended fighting between the Allies and Germany.

Disposal
Tartar was sold for scrap on 9 May 1919 to Thos. W. Ward of Hayle.

Pennant numbers

Notes

Citations

Bibliography

External links

HMS Tartar, Index of 19th Century Naval Vessels

 

Tribal-class destroyers (1905)
Ships built in Southampton
1907 ships
World War I destroyers of the United Kingdom
Maritime incidents in 1917
Ships built by John I. Thornycroft & Company